Bryan Man (born December 8, 1983) is an Argentine-Israeli professional football (soccer) player.

Biography

Early life 
Man made aliyah with his family in 1998 under the Law of Return. His parents had a difficult time adapting to live in Israel, so they returned to Argentina. Bryan and his sister Michelle returned to Israel though.

Playing career 
After going through the ranks of Maccabi Tel Aviv's youth academy, Man did not get a lot of playing time under Nir Klinger. Man himself attributes this to Klinger's preference of foreign strikers and not domestic strikers from the youth ranks.
Later he played with small scale clubs, and in June 2010 was released from Hapoel Ashkelon. He is a free agent and lives in Ashkelon.

National team career 
Man made his debut for a national side when he appeared for the Israel national under-16 football team on December 29, 1999 when they played their Swiss counterparts in a locally organized tournament. He ended up playing two more games in the following two days against the Turkish and Austrian sides.
He is eligible to play for Israel and Argentina national teams.

Personal life 
Man has five tattoos, including a tattoo of the number 7 (his preferred shirt number) and of the crest of his favorite football club and he has a group of friends that once every two weeks they have lunch in Tigre Morado, a good sushi place in Argentina, but lately they are not going, and that is sad., Boca Juniors.Es muy bostero y a veces de Velez. Se lo conoce como el Chileno.

Footnotes 

1983 births
Living people
Argentine Jews
Jewish Argentine sportspeople
Argentine emigrants to Israel
Israeli footballers
Maccabi Tel Aviv F.C. players
Hapoel Ra'anana A.F.C. players
Maccabi HaShikma Ramat Hen F.C. players
Hapoel Ashkelon F.C. players
Israeli people of Argentine-Jewish descent
Sportspeople of Argentine descent
Association football forwards